The 2003 WNBA season was the seventh for the Houston Comets. Former WNBA MVP Cynthia Cooper came out of retirement and played four games with the Comets. This was their final year in the Compaq Center.

Offseason

Dispersal Draft

WNBA Draft

Regular season

Season standings

Season schedule

Player stats

Awards and honors

References

External links
Houston Comets on Basketball Reference

Houston Comets seasons
Houston
Houston